Atomotricha chloronota is a moth in the family Oecophoridae first described by Edward Meyrick in 1914. It is endemic to New Zealand.

References

Moths described in 1914
Oecophoridae
Moths of New Zealand
Endemic fauna of New Zealand
Taxa named by Edward Meyrick
Endemic moths of New Zealand